Due to the political status of Taiwan, the Republic of China (ROC) competed as Chinese Taipei at the 2002 Winter Olympics in Salt Lake City, United States.  The International Olympic Committee mandates that the Chinese Taipei Olympic Committee flag is used, and not the flag of the Republic of China.

Bobsleigh

Men

Luge

Men

References
Official Olympic Reports
 Olympic Winter Games 2002, full results by sports-reference.com

Nations at the 2002 Winter Olympics
2002
2002 in Taiwanese sport